Peter James Sharpe (born 4 April 1944) is a former English cricketer.  Sharpe's batting and bowling styles are unknown.  He was born in Denver, Norfolk.

Sharpe made his debut for Norfolk in the 1963 Minor Counties Championship against Lincolnshire.  Sharpe played Minor counties cricket for Norfolk from 1963 to 1965, which included 22 Minor Counties Championship matches.  He made his only List A appearance against Hampshire in the 1965 Gillette Cup.  In this match, he took the wicket of Danny Livingstone for the cost of 38 runs from 13 overs.  With the bat, he dismissed for a duck by Peter Sainsbury.

References

External links
Peter Sharpe at ESPNcricinfo
Peter Sharpe at CricketArchive

1944 births
Living people
People from Denver, Norfolk
English cricketers
Norfolk cricketers